Aluminium sesquichlorohydrate is an aluminium salt that is used as an antiperspirant agent, a deodorant agent, and a cosmetic astringent. Aluminum sesquichlorohydrate works by physically blocking eccrine sweat glands. 

The United States Food and Drug Administration considers the use of aluminium sesquichlorohydrate in antiperspirants to be safe and it is permitted in concentrations up to 25%.

See also 
 Aluminium chlorohydrate

References 

Aluminium compounds
Chlorides
Cosmetics chemicals